Schnapper Rock is a western suburb on the North Shore of Auckland. The suburb is currently under local governance of Auckland Council.

North Shore Memorial Park was developed in 1973.

Demographics

Schnapper Rock had a population of 3,939 at the 2018 New Zealand census, an increase of 240 people (6.5%) since the 2013 census, and an increase of 2,508 people (175.3%) since the 2006 census. There were 1,107 households, comprising 1,923 males and 2,016 females, giving a sex ratio of 0.95 males per female. The median age was 33.6 years (compared with 37.4 years nationally), with 864 people (21.9%) aged under 15 years, 903 (22.9%) aged 15 to 29, 1,947 (49.4%) aged 30 to 64, and 228 (5.8%) aged 65 or older.

Ethnicities were 43.6% European/Pākehā, 2.9% Māori, 1.0% Pacific peoples, 52.7% Asian, and 4.4% other ethnicities. People may identify with more than one ethnicity.

The percentage of people born overseas was 58.4, compared with 27.1% nationally.

Although some people chose not to answer the census's question about religious affiliation, 57.4% had no religion, 30.4% were Christian, 2.8% were Hindu, 1.6% were Muslim, 2.4% were Buddhist and 1.4% had other religions.

Of those at least 15 years old, 1,161 (37.8%) people had a bachelor's or higher degree, and 231 (7.5%) people had no formal qualifications. The median income was $35,100, compared with $31,800 nationally. 744 people (24.2%) earned over $70,000 compared to 17.2% nationally. The employment status of those at least 15 was that 1,596 (51.9%) people were employed full-time, 441 (14.3%) were part-time, and 93 (3.0%) were unemployed.

Notes

Suburbs of Auckland
North Shore, New Zealand